Romerodus is an extinct genus of eugeneodontid holocephalian from the Carboniferous of North America. Fossils have been found in Nebraska.

References

Caseodontidae
Animals described in 1981